Anil Sharma is an Indian film director and producer.

Biography
Anil Sharma is a filmmaker of the Indian Cinema. He has worked with various established artists like Amitabh Bachchan, Dharmendra, Rajnikanth, Sunny Deol, Salman Khan, Zeenat Aman, Shashi Kapoor, Sridevi, Akshay Kumar, Govinda, Manisha Koirala, Katrina Kaif, Amrish Puri, Preity Zinta, Priyanka Chopra, Ameesha Patel, Naseeruddin Shah, Jeetendra, Bobby Deol, Jaya Prada and Priyanka Chopra.

He was brought up in Mathura, Uttar Pradesh, India. His grandfather, Pt. Dalchand was astrologer there. He later moved to Mumbai and did his B.Sc. degree at Khalsa College.

There he did theater, poetry and wrote for radio, when he finally got his first break in the Hindi film industry at the age of 18 as an Assistant director. He assisted Baldev Raj Chopra on films such as Pati Patni Aur Woh, The Burning Train and Insaf Ka Tarazu.

In 1980, at the age of 21 he debuted as a director with film Shradhanjali starring Raakhee. His first film brought him tremendous recognition and acclaim as the movie proved to be a huge success at the box office. In 1983, he directed Bandhan Kuchchey Dhaagon Ka a film based on the intriguing relationships of married life. It was acclaimed critically. After that, he made a number of films like Hukumat and Tahalka. Then in 2001, the movie, Gadar: Ek Prem Katha, turned out to be a milestone in his career as it created history at the box office.

After the success of Tahalka Sharma took a break from filmmaking for a few years and dedicated himself to open a Studio City in India on the lines of Universal Studios in LA. However, the project did not materialize. Anil then returned to filmmaking with Maharaja.

In 2001, Anil directed Gadar: Ek Prem Katha starring Sunny Deol and Ameesha Patel.  The film was a huge commercial success and critically appreciated as well. The film went on to become one of the biggest blockbusters in the history of Hindi cinema and till today, it still remains the most successful film of the first decade of the 21st century.

His next was The Hero: Love Story of a Spy starring Sunny Deol and Preity Zinta. He also gave Priyanka Chopra her first break with this movie. The film was on the backdrop of espionage and war between India-Pakistan. The film was considered to be the most expensive film ever made in Bollywood at that time. The film went on to be the third highest grosser of the year.

Ab Tumhare Hawale Watan Saathiyo was his next directorial . This was his first film with Amitabh Bachchan, Akshay Kumar and Bobby Deol. Divya Khosla Kumar was introduced in this film. This film is remembered for its patriotic fervor.

Apne(2007), his next film was critically praised for its depiction of family emotions and values. This film garnered Anil immense critical and box office success and remains as the first film starring all three Deols- Dharmendra, Sunny Deol and Bobby Deol.

In 2010, his next Veer, starring Salman Khan, Mithun Chakraborty, Jackie Shroff and newcomer Zarine Khan. The movie was much talked-about for its massive scale and depiction of the Indian Rajputana’s war with the British.

After this he made Singh Saab The Great  with Sunny Deol and Prakash Raj. The theme of the film was against corruption in the system and it spread the message of change and not revenge. In this film, Anil introduced Urvashi Rautela.

In Genius (2018),  he introduced his son Utkarsh Sharma as the lead, though he had already introduced him as a child artist in Gadar. He also introduced Ishita Chauhan in this film. Mithun Chakraborty and Nawazuddin Siddiqui formed the rest of the cast. For the first time in his career he shot in his hometown, Mathura, for a film. The film received generally poor reviews. Reviews were particularly critical of the confusing narrative and the standard of acting.  Bollywood Hungama gave it 1/5 stars saying "On the whole, GENIUS is an extremely poor and senseless fare." Ronak Kotecha of The Times of India was equally critical of the film giving it 2/5 stars. The Indian Express gave it a "nil" rating describing it as feeling redundant.

Filmography

References

External links

Film directors from Uttar Pradesh
Hindi-language film directors
Living people
20th-century Indian film directors
Hindi film producers
21st-century Indian film directors
1960 births